Where Are Your Children? is a 1943 American crime film directed by William Nigh and written by Hilary Lynn and George Wallace Sayre. The film stars Jackie Cooper, Gale Storm, Patricia Morison, John Litel, Gertrude Michael and Anthony Warde. The film was released on November 26, 1943, by Monogram Pictures.

Plot
Hip music and singing about kids getting into trouble, sneaking booze into clubs, stealing car, fight between girls, romance starts then guy goes in the Navy.

Cast
Jackie Cooper as Danny Cheston
Gale Storm as Judy Lawson
Patricia Morison as Linda Woodford
John Litel as Judge Edmonds
Gertrude Michael as Nell Lawson
Anthony Warde as Jim Lawson
Evelyn Eaton as Opal Becker
Addison Richards as Halstead
Sarah Edwards as Matron
Betty Blythe as Mrs. Cheston
Jimmy Zahner as Jerry Doane
Charles Williams as Mack 
Herbert Rawlinson as Brooks the Butler
John Laurenz as Petty Officer Jones
Neyle Morrow as Herb Walsh

Reception
Steve Broidy said it turned out to be a "big, big grossing picture."

References

External links
 

1943 films
1940s English-language films
American crime films
1943 crime films
Monogram Pictures films
Films directed by William Nigh
American black-and-white films
1940s American films